The San Rafael River is a tributary of the Green River, approximately  long, in east central Utah, United States. The river flows across a sparsely populated arid region of the Colorado Plateau, and is known for the isolated, scenic gorge through which it flows.

Description
It flows east-southeast along the north side of the Coal Cliffs and the prominent anticline called the San Rafael Swell, passing north of Window Butte (Window Blind Peak) and through two narrow slot canyons in Coconino Sandstone called the Upper and Lower Black Box. This area is known as the San Rafael Gorge, sometimes called the "Little Grand Canyon". (Actually, the "Little Grand Canyon" is a few miles upstream where the San Rafael passes between the Wedge on the north and Sid's Mountain and No Man's Mountain on the south). The San Rafael is the last major tributary of the Green River before it joins the Colorado River in Canyonlands National Park.

Diversion tunnels at the headwaters of the river in the Manti-La Sal National Forest provide irrigation water to Sanpete County on the west side of the Wasatch Plateau.

See also

 List of rivers of Utah
 List of tributaries of the Colorado River

References

External links

 The San Rafael Swell
 Utah Trails: San Rafael River Gorge

Rivers of Utah
Tributaries of the Green River (Colorado River tributary)
Canyons and gorges of Utah
San Rafael Swell
Tributaries of the Colorado River in Utah